The former French Catholic diocese of Alet (Lat.: Electensis) was created in 1317 from territory formerly in the diocese of Narbonne. The diocese continued until the French Revolution when it was suppressed by the Concordat of 1801.

Alet-les-Bains is located in south-west France, in the current department of Aude. The diocese was divided between: diocese of Carcassonne (to which the bishopric was formally attached) the diocese of Toulouse and the diocese of Perpignan.

History

In 1317, Pope John XXII engaged in a major restructuring of the episcopal organization of southern and western France. The diocese of Narbonne was very large, and it was deemed advisable to separate off the western part, the Archdeaconry of Alet, and erect it into a separate diocese. The papal bull, Sane Considerantes, issued on 20 August 1317, envisioned the creation of the new diocese with its seat at Limoux, and the promotion of the Church of Saint-Martin into a cathedral. In the next few months, however, Pope John changed his mind. On 28 (or 18) February 1318, he revoked his previous arrangements and named Alet as the site of the new bishopric; and on 1 March 1318 he appointed Bartholomaeus, the Abbot of the Monastery of Alet, and a papal nuncio, as the new bishop. His Abbey of Notre-Dame d'Alet, which followed the Rule of Saint Benedict, became the cathedral of the diocese, and its monks became Canons of the cathedral chapter. In erecting the new diocese, Pope John transferred eighty parishes from the diocese of Narbonne to Alet.

The Cathedral of Alet was served by a Chapter, composed of twelve canons. The dignities were: the Dean, the Archdeacon, the Treasurer and the Precentor. There were sixteen beneficiaries. The Chapter had the right, granted by the Papacy, to elect the bishop of Alet. The Chapter was secularized on 17 November 1531 by the papal bulla Ad Exequendum of Pope Clement VII, at the request of Bishop Guillaume de Joyeuse and at the suggestion of King Francis I. The Pope explained in the bull that the problem was twofold: the number of people seeking to become monks had greatly decreased; and the financial situation of the Chapter had severely deteriorated. At the beginning the money was sufficient to supply the needs of thirty or more monks, but in 1531 it could scarcely support seven or eight. The priories which had belonged to the Chapter had gradually been appropriated by the bishop who appointed commendatory abbots and priors, causing money to be directed away from the monastic foundations. In addition the coldness of the weather and the frequent wars, with plundering and pillaging, had diminished regular revenues. The present income could satisfy the requirements for secular dignities and canons, but could not support the entire monastic establishment. In order to place the finances of the new secular chapter on a firm footing, the Pope ordered the suppression of a number of priories in several dioceses: Notre-Dame de Peyran et de Rupefort, S. Valerius, de Varilles, de Exchalabria, and de Rupifera (all Benedictine houses); many of these were being held in commendam, but all were placed at the disposal of the Chapter.

Pope John XXII also secularized one of the monasteries in the new diocese, Saint Paul de Fenouillèdes, converting it into a Collegiate Church, administered by a Chapter composed of three dignitaries, twelve Canons and thirty semi-prebends. There were three other abbeys in the diocese: Saint Jacques de Jocou, Saint Martin de Lys and Saint Pierre.

The diocese was suppressed by the National Constituent Assembly in the Civil Constitution of the Clergy in 1790. The territory of the diocese of Alet was incorporated into a new (republican) 'Constitutional Diocese', the Diocese of Aude, which was coterminous with the new administrative 'Départment de l'Aude (named after a river); the new diocese included 565 parishes which had been part of the (arch)dioceses of Narbonne, Carcassonne, Alet, Saint-Papoul and Mirepoix. The headquarters of the diocese was to be Narbonne, and the Metropolitan of the Metropolitanate of the 'Métropole du Sud' was to be in Toulouse.
 
After the signing of the Concordat of 1801 with First Consul Napoleon Bonaparte, the diocese of Alet was not revived, but abolished by Pope Pius VII in his bull Qui Christi Domini of 29 November 1801.

Bishops

1318–1333 ?: Barthélemy, O.S.B., Abbot Sainte-Marie d'Alet
1333-†1355 : Guillaume (I) d'Alzonne, O.S.B., Abbot of la Grasse
1355-†1363 : Guillame (II), O.S.B., Abbot of Sendras
1363-†1385 : Arnaud de Villars
1385–1386 : Cardinal Pierre Aycelin de Montaigut (Administrator)
1386–1390 : Robert du Bosc (Avignon Obedience)
1390-†1420 : Henri (I) Bayler (Avignon Obedience)
1421–1441 : Pierre (II) Assalbit, O.E.S.A.
1441–1442 : Antoine de Saint-Étienne
1443–1447 : Pierre (III)
1448–1454 : Élie de Pompadour
1454–1455 : Louis d'Aubusson, O.S.B.
1455–1460 : Ambroise de Cameraco, Abbot of Saint-Germain-des-Prés
1461-†1468 : Antoine (I) Gobert
1468-†1486 : Guillaume (III.) Oliva
1487–1488 : Pierre (III) Hallwyn
1489-†1508 : Guillaume (IV.) de Rupe, Abbot of Montolieu
 [Jean Dupuy, Abbot of Saint-Tibéry]
1508–1523 : Pierre (IV.) Raymond de Guiert, Abbot of Sorèze
1524–1540 : Guillaume (V.) de Joyeuse
1541–1559 : Guillaume VI. de Joyeuse
1560-†1564 : François de Lestrange
1565–1572? : Antoine (II.) Dax
(1572–1594) : Sede Vacante
[1594–1603 : Christophe de L'Estang]
1603-†1603 : Pierre (V.) de Polverel
1607-1637 : Étienne de Polverel
1637-†1677 : Nicolas Pavillon
1679–1684 : Louis-Alphonse de Valbelle
1692–1698 : Victor-Augustin de Méliand
1699-1708 : Charles-Nicolas Taffoureau de Fontaine
1709-1723 : Jacques Maboul
1723-1762 : Joseph-François de Boucaud
1763-1793 : Charles de la Cropte de Chantérac

See also 
 Catholic Church in France
 List of Catholic dioceses in France

References

Bibliography

Reference works
, pp. 486–487.  (Use with caution; obsolete)
  (in Latin) 
 (in Latin)

Studies

Alet
1317 establishments in Europe
1310s establishments in France
1801 disestablishments in France
Religious organizations established in the 1310s
Dioceses established in the 14th century